Csóka (meaning "Western jackdaw") is Hungarian word and may refer to:

 Hungarian name for Čoka, a town in North Banat District, Serbia
 Hungarian name for Stârcu, a village in Ceanu Mare Commune, Cluj County, Romania

People with the surname
 Antonei B. Csoka, biogerontologist

See also 

 Csókás (disambiguation)

Hungarian-language surnames